Todd Schofield (May 15, 1970 – October 27, 2018), known as Todd Youth, was an American guitarist, best known for his work with Warzone, Murphy's Law and Danzig.

Biography 
Schofield was born and raised in Passaic County, New Jersey, and began playing in several New York hardcore bands at a young age, leading to the nickname, Youth. He debuted with Agnostic Front in 1983 but did not play on any recordings. Youth also played for New York City act Warzone until around 1986. He joined Murphy's Law (another New York City band) that year, recording on various works with them, including three full-length albums. Youth performed with Murphy's Law until 1995.

After leaving Murphy's Law, he recorded a single with a band named The Homewreckers in 1996. Around this time Youth evolved his style from hardcore to implementing some of his 1970s punk influences, such as New York Dolls, Dead Boys and The Heartbreakers, thus he joined famous New York City glam punk band D Generation, replacing Richard Bacchus on guitar. He was with D Generation from 1996 to 1998 and recorded on their album Through The Darkness, and Youth co-wrote the track "Sunday Secret Saints" with Jesse Malin.

Chrome Locust was formed by Youth, D Generation drummer Michael Wildwood, and Vásquez bassist Jim Heneghan in 1998. In May 1999, Chrome Locust released a self-titled album on Tee Pee Records. The cover art was reminiscent of The Age of Quarrel by Cro-Mags. In a late interview, Youth stated that The Age of Quarrel was one of the best hardcore records ever released. Youth disbanded Chrome Locust in order to audition for Danzig, despite having a potential offer to tour with The Hellacopters. Youth was also contacted to audition for Foo Fighters during this period. He stated that his decision to audition for Danzig, instead of Foo Fighters, had to do with having more fun on tour and the chance to work with Joey Castillo, who was also from the hardcore punk rock scene, having played with Wasted Youth.

Playing with Danzig and Samhain 
During the summer of 1999, he successfully auditioned for Danzig; he joined as the guitarist. Coincidentally, former D Generation bandmate, bassist Howie Pyro, joined Danzig soon after. The same year Glenn Danzig had reformed his horror punk band Samhain, guitarist Damien decided not to join the band for their reunion tour, thus Todd was asked to replace him.

Youth only had three months to practice and learn the Samhain and Danzig sets. Although not an original member of Samhain, fans welcomed him to the lineup, some even mistaking him for Damien. The band AFI had toured with Samhain during 1999, and their frontman Davey Havok was a longtime fan, so in 2000 Youth, along with Samhain members London May and Steve Zing masterminded horror punk band Son of Sam.

This featured Davey Havok on vocals and on their album Songs from the Earth with guest appearances from Glenn Danzig.

With Danzig, Youth recorded the studio album, I Luciferi, released in 2002, which featured Glenn Danzig, Howie Pyro and future Queens of the Stone Age drummer Joey Castillo. Todd's guitar work was also included on the live album, Live on the Black Hand Side, released in 2001 and the compilation record, The Lost Tracks of Danzig, released in 2007. Youth left the group in 2003 but kept in contact with Glenn Danzig through the years. He rejoined Danzig in 2007 for the Halloween Tour. He left Danzig again, to join Glen Campbell's band. Youth stated that his father, who also was a musician, was overjoyed to hear about his opportunity with Campbell, which he considered to be Todd's big break in the music business.

Recent times 
Youth also played with Motörhead in May 2003, filling in for three dates on Motörhead's tour of the United States, as Phil Campbell's mother had died and he was unable to continue on tour.

Youth led Los Angeles rockers The Chelsea Smiles, which in some ways marked a return to the style of music Youth played with D Generation, with the band implementing similar influences, such as The Stooges, New York Dolls, MC5 and Chuck Berry. They released their debut EP Nowhere Ride in 2005. The debut full-length Chelsea Smiles album Thirty Six Hours Later was released in November 2006, and its European release date was early December of the same year.

The Chelsea Smiles were invited by Social Distortion to open for them in 2006. The Chelsea Smiles later toured Europe in 2007.

In 2008, Youth reformed the band, Son of Sam, but Davey Havok did not return on vocals. As with the first Son of Sam release, all of the music was written by Youth.

2008 and 2009 also saw Youth joining singer Glen Campbell's band. Youth recorded three songs on Glen's comeback record Meet Glen Campbell. Youth did various TV show appearances (Jimmy Kimmel, The Tonight Show) and toured the UK in support of the release.

In 2009, the Chelsea Smiles released a new, self-titled release. The band undertook a short UK tour with horror punk artist Wednesday 13, in support of the release. At the end of 2009, the Chelsea Smiles decided the end had come for the band and changed the name to the Royal Highness.

Youth began writing with Wednesday 13 with plans to record an album under the band name Gunfire 76. The band had more of a rock sound than Wednesday 13.

Youth joined Cheap Trick performing the "Sgt. Pepper Live" show at the Las Vegas Hilton in September 2009. He appeared on Cheap Trick's album, The Latest with the blessing of guitarist, Rick Nielsen. During an interview, Youth recalled Nielsen calling him a member of the New Jersey Dolls, as a reference to his former band, D Generation.

In January 2010 Youth was announced as the second guitarist with Michael Monroe during a press conference held in Los Angeles. The band also featured Sam Yaffa on bass, guitarist, Ginger, from The Wildhearts, and Jimmy Clarke on drums. Youth's tenure with Michael Monroe was cut short due to issues with band management as well as an offer to audition and tour with his childhood hero, Ace Frehley.  Youth did not confirm that he had left Monroe's band until the end of March 2010.

By the end of March 2010, Youth was confirmed as the permanent touring guitarist with ex-Kiss guitarist Ace Frehley. Youth stated that Ace didn't require rehearsal before performing in concert, quoting Ace as saying, "Eh, you know the songs, right?"  Youth fit in well with Ace's band and often took center stage to sing the classic Kiss song, "Flaming Youth."  He was also featured with the  rest of the band in the photos section of Frehley's book, No Regrets.  Youth worked with Frehley for roughly four years.

At the end of 2010, Youth toured with Jesse Malin and the St. Mark's Social. In 2010, the first single "American Dream" was released on One Voice by Capricorn, a band formed by Youth, Phil Caivano (of Monster Magnet) and Karl Rosqvist (of The Chelsea Smiles and Michael Monroe).

Youth played several shows as the lead guitarist for The Joneses in 2015 and by 2017 he returned to his hardcore roots when joining hardcore punk supergroup, Bloodclot.   On July 14, 2017, Bloodclot released a record entitled Up in Arms.  Along with Youth, the band also featured vocalist John Joseph (Cro-Mags), Nick Oliveri (Dwarves) and Joey Castillo (Danzig). The band toured with Negative Approach in the US and planned on touring the UK in 2018, but split up before doing so. Youth cited differences in opinion regarding band matters with Joseph.

On August 18, 2017, Youth played his first show with his new band Fireburn. A hardcore punk band that features Israel Joseph I (formerly of Bad Brains), Nick Townsend (currently/formerly of Deadbeat, Knife Fight), and Todd Jones (currently/formerly of Nails, Terror).

They released their first EP on Closed Casket Actvites titled Don't Stop the Youth.

On October 1, 2017, Youth held a tribute to his former Warzone bandmate, Raymond Barbieri AKA Raybeez, on the 20th anniversary of his death, at Tompkins Square Park in NYC. Many hardcore contemporaries took part in this tribute alongside Youth.

Death 
Youth died on October 27, 2018, at the age of 48.

A memorial was held for Youth in California on November 4, 2018, at the Velvet Margarita Cantina and another was held in New York at Niagara (formerly A7) on November 8, 2018. The memorials featured musicians and friends from the hardcore scene and bands he had worked with, playing and speaking in his honor. H.R. and Dr. Know from Youth's favorite band, Bad Brains, performed at the New York memorial. H.R. is also featured on the song "Todd Youth", a tribute his D Generation bandmate Jesse Malin released in 2020.

Some of Youth's ashes were placed at the Hare Krishna Tree in Tompkins Square Park on the night of the New York memorial. The remaining ashes were spread, per his wishes, in the holy Yamuna River in India.

Discography 
This discography documents the recordings Todd Youth played on during his time with the various bands that he was a part of, throughout his musical career.

With Murphy's Law 
 Back with a Bong (1989)
 The Best of Times (1991)
 Dedicated (1996)
 "Monster Mash" (single, 1991)
 Good for Now (EP, 1993)
 "My Woman from Tokyo" (single, 1995)
 Dedicated (1996)

With The Homewreckers 
 "I Want More" (single, 1996)

With D Generation 
Prohibition (EP, 1998)
"Helpless" (single, 1998)
Through the Darkness (1999)

With Chrome Locust 
Chrome Locust (1999)

With Son of Sam 
Songs from the Earth (2000)
Into the Night (2008)

With Danzig 
Live on the Black Hand Side (2001)
I Luciferi (2002)
The Lost Tracks of Danzig (2007)

With The Chelsea Smiles 
Nowhere Ride (EP, 2005)
Thirty Six Hours Later (2006)
The Chelsea Smiles (2009)

With Glen Campbell 
Meet Glen Campbell (2008)
Greatest Hits (2009)

With Cheap Trick 
The Latest (2009)

With Jesse Malin and the St. Mark's Social 
Love it to Life (2010)

With Bloodclot 
 Up in Arms (2017)

With Fireburn 
 Don't Stop the Youth (EP, 2017)
 "Shine" (single, 2018)

Filmography 
American Hardcore (2006)
Kiss Loves You (2007)

References 

1971 births
2018 deaths
American punk rock guitarists
Place of death missing
People from New Jersey
Horror punk musicians
Motörhead members
Danzig (band) members
Samhain (band) members
Agnostic Front members